Hambleton District Council is elected every four years.

Political control
Since the first election to the council in 1973 political control of the council has been held by the following parties:

Leadership
The leaders of the council since 2010 have been:

Council elections
1973 Hambleton District Council election
1976 Hambleton District Council election
1979 Hambleton District Council election (New ward boundaries)
1983 Hambleton District Council election
1987 Hambleton District Council election
1991 Hambleton District Council election (District boundary changes took place but the number of seats remained the same)
1995 Hambleton District Council election
1999 Hambleton District Council election
2003 Hambleton District Council election (New ward boundaries)
2007 Hambleton District Council election
2011 Hambleton District Council election
2015 Hambleton District Council election (New ward boundaries)
2019 Hambleton District Council election

By-election results

References

External links
Hambleton District Council

 
Hambleton District
Council elections in North Yorkshire
District council elections in England